Royal Air Force Ash or more simply RAF Ash (formerly RAF Sandwich) was a Royal Air Force underground control centre and radar station situated near the village of Woodnesborough, Kent, England.

History

RAF Sandwich 
RAF Sandwich was originally a Ground Controlled Interception (GCI) site situated in Ash Road, Sandwich. However, after the Second World War the area was chosen for one of a chain of ROTOR air defence radar stations and the site was relocated to an underground bunker 1.5 miles to the southwest in Marshborough Road, Ash. The site later closed on 1 October 1958 and was sold on 22 March 1965.

RAF Ash 
In 1980 the site was re-acquired by the RAF for the development of Improved UK Air Defence Ground Environment (IUKADGE) and became operational as RAF Ash on 6 January 1986. It closed as an RAF station in 1995. The Ministry of Defence sold the site on 24 July 1998.

Post-closure 
The site is now used as a secure data centre by The Bunker, an Internet hosting company.

References

External links

 RAF Sandwich/RAF Ash
 www.thebunker.net - current owners

Royal Air Force stations in Kent
Internet hosting
1939 establishments in England
1998 disestablishments in England